Filippo Volandri was the defending champion but decided not to participate.
Roberto Bautista-Agut won the title, defeating Dušan Lajović 6–3, 6–1 in the final.

Seeds

Draw

Finals

Top half

Bottom half

References
 Main Draw
 Qualifying Draw

Orbetello Challenger - Singles
2012 Singles